This is a list of the gymnasts who represented their country at the 1996 Summer Olympics in Atlanta from 19 July to 4 August 1996. Gymnasts in two disciplines (artistic gymnastics and rhythmic gymnastics) participated in the Games.

Women's artistic gymnastics

Men's artistic gymnastics

Rhythmic gymnasts

Individual

Group

References 

Gymnastics at the 1996 Summer Olympics
Gymnastics-related lists